Ashok Swain is an Indian-origin academic and writer. He's currently a professor of peace and conflict research at the Department of Peace and Conflict Research, Uppsala University. In 2017, he was appointed as the UNESCO Chair on International Water Cooperation and became the first UNESCO Chair of Uppsala University.

He's also the Head of the Department of Conflict Research at Uppsala University. He's the Director of the Research School for International Water Cooperation of Uppsala University & SIWI.

Swain has written opinion articles in publications including Outlook, DailyO, and Gulf News.

Early life and education 

Swain was born in the eastern Indian State of Odisha. After studying in his village school, he completed his Bachelor of Arts from Ravenshaw College, Cuttack under Utkal University, Bhubaneswar.

He received his Master of Arts from the University of Delhi.

Swain received his Ph.D. in 1991 from the School of International Studies of Jawaharlal Nehru University, New Delhi, India with the thesis titled Security of Small States in the International System.

Political views 
Swain has expressed his views through his articles and tweets. He has often been critical of right-wing Hindtuva ideologies in India.

Anti-CAA protests 
Writing about the widespread anti-CAA protests in 2019, Swain said the Modi government's legislation such as the Citizenship (Amendment) Act, 2019 made India's 200 million Muslims nervous about their status in an "overwhelmingly Hindu-majority country."

Swain wrote that Muslims saw through the Citizenship (Amendment) Act's dangers as that law may lead to millions of Muslims being made stateless though the Act initially only sought to give citizenship to religious minorities from India's neighboring countries who are fleeing those countries and seeking refuge in India. The Act explicitly failed to mention Muslims while mentioning every other religion.

Article 370 
Swain was critical of the Modi government's decision to revoke the special status of Jammu & Kashmir. Swain tweeted that liberals who had turned nationalists should be careful about celebrating this decision.

OCI Card cancellation 

Swain has filed a suit in the Delhi High Court in India challenging the cancellation of his Overseas Citizen of India (OCI) card by the Ministry of Home Affairs, Government of India.

In his lawsuit, Swain has said that he received a show cause notice in October 2020 in which Swain was alleged to have indulged in "inflammatory speeches and anti-India activities." The Embassy of India to Sweden and Latvia has cancelled Swain's OCI card in February 2022.

Swain has stated in his legal submission that he has "never engaged in any inflammatory speeches or anti-India activities." He has further stated that as a scholar, it is his role in society to "discuss and critique the policies of the Government." Swain further states that he analyzes and criticizes certain policies of the present India government; however, such criticism of the "current ruling dispensation shall not be tantamount to anti-India activities."

In February 2023, the Delhi High Court granted further time of four weeks to the Government of India to file its response on the suit filed by Swain challenging the basis for the cancellation of his OCI card.

Selected publications

Books 

 Ashok Swain & Anders Jägerskog, Emerging Security Threats in the Middle East: The Impact of Climate Change and Globalization (Lanham: Rowman & Littlefield, 2016).
 Anton Earle, Ana Elise Cascao, Stina Hansson, Anders Jägerskog, Ashok Swain, & J¨oakim Öjendal, Transboundary Water Management and the Climate Change Debate (London: Routledge, 2015).
 Ashok Swain, Understanding Emerging Security Challenges: Threats and Opportunities (London: Routledge, 2012). 
 Ashok Swain, Struggle Against the State: Social Network and Protest Mobilization in India (Farnham: Ashgate Publishing Limited, 2010).
 Ashok Swain, Managing Water Conflict: Asia, Africa and the Middle East (London & New York: Routledge, 2004).
 Ashok Swain, The Environmental Trap: The Ganges River Diversion, Bangladeshi Migration and Conflicts in India (Uppsala: Department of Peace and Conflict Research, 1996).
 Ashok Swain, Environment and Conflict: Analyzing the Developing World (Uppsala: Department of Peace and Conflict Research, 1993).

Edited books 
 Ashok Swain, Joakim Öjendal, & Anders Jägerskog, eds., Handbook of Security and the Environment (Cheltenham: Edward Elgar, 2021).
 Anders Jägerskog, Michael Schulz & Ashok Swain, Routledge Handbook on Middle East Security (London: Routledge, 2019).
 Ashok Swain & Joakim Öjendal, eds., Routledge Handbook of Environmental Conflict and Peacebuilding (London: Routledge, 2018).
 Anders Jägerskog, Ashok Swain & Joakim Öjendal, eds., Water Security (4 Volume Set) (London: Sage Publications Ltd, 2014).
 Ramses Amer, Ashok Swain & Joakim Öjendal. eds., The Security-Development Nexus: Peace, Conflict and Development (London: Anthem Press, 2012).
 Ashok Swain, Ramses Amer & Joakim Öjendal. eds., The Democratization Project: Opportunities and Challenges (London: Anthem Press, 2009).
 Ashok Swain, Ramses Amer & Joakim Öjendal. Eds., Globalization and Challenges to Building Peace (London, New York & Delhi: Anthem Press, 2007).
 Ashok Swain, ed., Islam and Violent Separatism: New Democracies in Southeast Asia (London, New York & Bahrain: Kegan Paul, 2007).
 Ashok Swain, ed.,Diasporas, Armed Conflicts and Peacebuilding in their Homelands (Uppsala University, Department of Peace and Conflict Research, 2007).
 Fiona Rotberg & Ashok Swain, eds., Natural Resources Scarcity in South Asia: Nepal's Water (Stockholm: Institute for Security and Development Policy, 2007).
 Ashok Swain, ed., Education as Social Action: Knowledge, Identity and Power (Basingstoke & New York: Palgrave Macmillan, 2005).

References

External links
 Ashok Swain Twitter Page

Scholars from Odisha
1965 births
Living people
Indian expatriate academics
Academic staff of Uppsala University
Jawaharlal Nehru University alumni
Indian emigrants to Sweden